Mangonia is a genus of flowering plants in the family Araceae. The genus contains only two known species native to southern Brazil and Uruguay.

Mangonia tweedieana Schott. - Rio Grande do Sul, Uruguay
Mangonia uruguaya (Hicken) Bogner - Cerro Largo in Uruguay

References

Aroideae
Araceae genera
Flora of South America